Janusz Domaniewski (1891–1954) was a Polish ornithologist.

Notable published works include the following:

 1918: Die Stellung des Urocynchramus pylzowi Przev. in der Systematik. J. Ornithol. 66(4): 421–424.  (first appraisal of the true distinctness of Przewalski's finch)
 1924: Beitrag zur Kenntnis der Gattung Thamnophilus Vieillot. Bull. Acad. Polonaise des Sci. et des Lettres: 753–763. (review of the species and subspecies of the genus Thamnophilus)
 1925:
 Contribution a la connaissance des pics paléarctiques. Ann. Zool. Mus. Polonici Hist. Nat.: 75–84. (taxonomic review of Palaearctic woodpeckers)
 Systematik und geographische Verbreitung der Gattung Budytes. Ann. Zool. Mus. Polonici Hist. Nat.: 85-125. (review of the genus Budytes)

References

Article on Domaniewski

1891 births
1954 deaths
Polish ornithologists
20th-century Polish zoologists